The 4730th Air Defense Group is a discontinued United States Air Force organization. Its last assignment was with the New York Air Defense Sector at McGuire Air Force Base, New Jersey, where it was discontinued in 1959.

The group was formed to provide a single command and support organization for the two fighter interceptor squadrons of Air Defense Command that were tenants at McGuire, a Military Air Transport Service base.  It was also assigned a squadron to perform aircraft maintenance.  The 4730th was discontinued when the 332d Fighter-Interceptor Squadron moved in 1959, leaving only a single fighter squadron at McGuire.

History
The 4730th Air Defense Group was established to provide a headquarters for the two Air Defense Command (ADC) Fighter-Interceptor Squadrons (FIS) stationed at McGuire Air Force Base, New Jersey, a Military Air Transport Service (MATS) base. MATS' 1611th Air Base Group acted as host base organization for McGuire. The group was assigned the 332d and 539th Fighter-Interceptor Squadrons (FIS), flying radar equipped and Mighty Mouse rocket armed North American F-86D Sabre aircraft as its operational components. Some of the Sabres were F-86Ls, which were equipped with a data link for interception control through the Semi-Automatic Ground Environment system. The group mission was to train and maintain tactical flying units to defend the Mid-Atlantic United States.  The two fighter squadrons were already stationed at McGuire and had been assigned to the New York Air Defense Sector.

Maintenance for the two squadrons was provided by the 601st Consolidated Aircraft Maintenance Squadron (CAMS), which was activated at McGuire along with the rest of the group. The 332d FIS converted to Convair F-102 Delta Dagger aircraft in July 1957, while the 539th FIS retained its F-86s until the Spring of 1959, when it converted to Convair F-106 Delta Darts.

The group was discontinued shortly after the 332d FIS departed for England Air Force Base, Louisiana, leaving only a single operational ADC squadron at McGuire. The 601st CAMS was inactivated with the group, while the 539th FIS was assigned directly to the New York Air Defense Sector.

Lineage
 Designated as the 4730th Air Defense Group and organized on 8 February 1957
 Discontinued on 1 August 1959

Assignments
 New York Air Defense Sector, 8 February 1957 – 1 August 1959

Components
 332d Fighter-Interceptor Squadron, 8 February 1957 – 10 July 1959
 539th Fighter-Interceptor Squadron, 8 February 1957 – 1 August 1959
 601st Consolidated Aircraft Maintenance Squadron, 8 February 1957 – 1 August 1959

Stations
 McGuire Air Force Base, New Jersey, 8 February 1957 – 1 August 1959

Aircraft
 F-86D: 1957–59
 F-86L: 1957–59
 F-102A: 1957–59
 F-106A: 1959

Commanders
 Col. Herbert L. Phillips, by 1 January 1958 – ca. 31 December 1958
 Col. Phillip Brooks, ca. 1 January 1959 – 1959

See also
 List of F-106 Delta Dart units of the United States Air Force
 List of Sabre and Fury units in the US military
 List of United States Air Force Aerospace Defense Command Interceptor Squadrons

References

Notes

Bibliography

Further reading
 

Air defense groups of the United States Air Force
Aerospace Defense Command units
Four digit groups of the United States Air Force
Military units and formations established in 1957
Military units and formations in New Jersey